Listed below are the dates and results for the 2006 FIFA World Cup qualification rounds for Africa. 51 teams took part (only Comoros and Djibouti did not enter), competing for 5 World Cup places.

Format
The qualification was composed of two Rounds. 9 teams entered the competition directly on the Second Round: the 5 teams that qualified for the 2002 World Cup Finals (Cameroon, Nigeria, Senegal, South Africa, and Tunisia) and the 4 highest-ranking teams in the June 25, 2003 FIFA world rankings (Congo DR, Côte d'Ivoire, Egypt, and Morocco). The other 42 teams were paired 2-by-2 and played knock-out matches home-and-away. The 21 winners would advance to the Second Round.

In the Second Round, the 30 teams were divided in 5 groups of 6 teams each. Teams in each group would play against each other in a home-and-away basis. The team with most points in each group would qualify to the World Cup.

The competition also constituted the qualification competition for the 2006 African Nations Cup with the top three nations of each group qualifying (except for Egypt, which qualifies as the host nation, the fourth nation in Egypt's group qualifying in Egypt's place).

The African qualifying zone saw 4 out of 5 finals places going to World Cup debutants (Angola, Togo, Côte d'Ivoire and Ghana). Nigeria missed out on a fourth consecutive finals appearance while Cameroon did not reach their fifth consecutive finals.

The African zone also featured a group of death — Group 3, which brought together Africa's most frequent World Cup qualifier Cameroon with the two eventual finalists of the 2006 Africa Cup of Nations: Egypt and the Ivory Coast.

First round 

 

 

|}

Second round

Group 1

Togo qualified for the 2006 FIFA World Cup.
Togo, Senegal, and Zambia qualified for the 2006 African Cup of Nations.

Group 2

Ghana qualified for the 2006 FIFA World Cup.
Ghana, Congo DR, and South Africa qualified for the 2006 African Cup of Nations.

Group 3

Côte d'Ivoire qualified for the 2006 FIFA World Cup.
Côte d'Ivoire, Cameroon, and Libya qualified for the 2006 African Cup of Nations (Egypt qualified directly as hosts.)

Group 4

Angola qualified for the 2006 FIFA World Cup.
Angola, Nigeria, and Zimbabwe qualified for the 2006 African Cup of Nations.

Group 5

Tunisia qualified for the 2006 FIFA World Cup.
Tunisia, Morocco, and Guinea qualified for the 2006 African Cup of Nations.

Qualified teams
The following five teams from CAF qualified for the final tournament.

1 Bold indicates champions for that year. Italic indicates hosts for that year.

Goalscorers
There were 506 goals scored in 190 matches, for an average of 2.66 goals per match.
11 goals

 Emmanuel Adebayor

9 goals

 Didier Drogba

8 goals

 Obafemi Martins

7 goals

 Aruna Dindane
 Henri Camara

6 goals

 Mansour Boutabout
 Akwá
 Pierre Webó
 Amr Zaki
 Sambégou Bangoura
 Dennis Oliech

5 goals

 Tshepiso Molwantwa
 Dipsy Selolwane
 Moumouni Dagano
 Cafú
 Carlos Caló
 Haytham Tambal
 Francileudo Santos
 Collins Mbesuma

4 goals

 Oumar Tchomogo
 Samuel Eto'o
 Armel Disney
 Shabani Nonda
 Stephen Appiah
 Asamoah Gyan
 Kaba Diawara
 Ahmed al Masli
 Soumaila Coulibaly
 Youssouf Hadji
 El Hadji Diouf
 José Clayton
 David Obua
 Shingayi Kaondera
 Peter Ndlovu

3 goals

 Nassim Akrour
 Abdelmalek Cherrad
 Francis Oumar
 Mohamed Aboutrika
 Abdel Halim Ali
 Ahmed Hassan
 Théodore Nzue Nguema
 Matthew Amoah
 Michael Essien
 Pascal Feindouno
 Isaac Tondo
 Nader Kara
 Ahmed Saad Osman
 Noel Mkandawire
 Marouane Chamakh
 Talal El Karkouri
 Jaouad Zairi
 Dário
 Abedi Saïd
 Sibusiso Zuma
 Mohamed Kader
 Mamam Cherif Touré
 Haykel Guemamdia
 Harry Milanzi
 Benjani Mwaruwari

2 goals

 Flávio
 Mouritala Ogunbiyi
 Nelson Gabolwelwe
 Abdoulaye Cissé
 Yahia Kébé
 Geremi
 Rigobert Song
 Rudy Bhebey
 Michel Bouanga
 Trésor Mputu
 Tarek El-Said
 Mido
 Emad Moteab
 Mohamed Shawky
 Thierry Issiémou
 Stéphane N'Guéma
 Nana Arhin Duah
 Isaac Boakye
 Sulley Muntari
 Ousmane Bangoura
 Fodé Mansaré
 John Barasa
 Tarik El Taib
 Emmanuel Chipatala
 Essau Kanyenda
 Heston Munthali
 Russel Mwafulirwa
 Dramane Coulibaly
 Frédéric Kanouté
 Julius Aghahowa
 Nwankwo Kanu
 Yakubu
 John Lomami
 Papa Bouba Diop
 Moussa N'Diaye
 Mbulelo Mabizela
 Benni McCarthy
 Steven Pienaar
 Moustapha Salifou
 Yao Junior Sènaya
 Adel Chedli
 Kaies Ghodhbane
 Karim Haggui
 Geoffrey Sserunkuma
 Gift Kampamba
 Ignatius Lwipa
 Nchimunya Mweetwa
 Mumamba Numba

1 goal

 Isâad Bourahli
 Sofiane Daoud
 Hamza Yacef
 Antar Yahia
 Bruno Mauro
 Paulo Figueiredo
 Freddy
 Mantorras
 Rebelo Lopes
 Zé Kalanga
 Anicet Adjamossi
 Coffi Agbessi
 Jocelyn Ahouéya
 Rachad Chitou
 Bachirou Osseni
 Stéphane Sessègnon
 Séïdath Tchomogo
 Mogogi Gabonamong
 Tshepo Motlhabankwe
 Abdoul-Aziz Nikiema
 Saïdou Panandétiguiri
 Florent Rouamba
 Amadou Touré
 Mamadou Zongo
 Gabriel Nzeyimana
 Roudolphe Douala
 Guy Feutchine
 Bill Tchato
 Janício Martins
 Jimmy Modeste
 Gervais Batota
 Bertrand Bouity
 Rolf-Christel Guié-Mien
 Mbiamcie Mvoubi
 Dikilu Bageta
 Mbala Mbuta Biscotte
 Ngasanya Ilongo
 Djoko Kaluyituka
 Cyrille Kitambala
 Zola Matumona
 Marcel Kimemba Mbayo
 Kabamba Musasa
 Kanga Akalé
 Bonaventure Kalou
 Bakari Koné
 Gilles Yapi Yapo
 Ahmed Eid Abdel Malek
 Mohamed Abdelwahab
 Hassan Mostafa
 Sergio Barila
 Teshome Getu
 Georges Akieremy
 Catilina Aubameyang
 Etienne Bito'o
 Etienne Alain Djissikadie
 Dieudonné Londo
 Shiva Nzigou
 Abdou-Rahman Njie
 Edrissa Sonko
 Lawrence Adjei
 Godwin Attram
 Joetex Asamoah Frimpong
 Souleymane Youla
 Dionisio Fernandes
 Edwin Mukenya
 Mike Okoth Origi
 Musa Otieno
 Moses Ramafole
 Alvin Kieh
 Zizi Roberts
 Arcadia Toe
 Marei Al Ramly
 Younes Al Shibani
 Mohamed El Rabty
 Othman Ferjani
 Marei Suliman
 Robert Edmond
 J. Radonamahafalison
 A. Rakotondramanana
 Patrick Mabedi
 Peter Mgangira
 Albert Mpinganjira
 Jimmy Zakazaka
 Abdoulaye Demba
 Mamadou Diallo
 Souleymane Diamoutene
 Mahamadou Diarra
 Seydou Keita
 Djibril Sidibé
 Mohamed Sissoko
 Yohan Langlet
 Ahmed Sidibe
 Jerry Louis
 Cyril Mourgine
 Richardo Nabuth
 Mounir Diane
 Houssine Kharja
 Youssef Mokhtari
 Youssef Safri
 Paulus Shipanga
 Joseph Enakarhire
 Christian Obodo
 Peter Odemwingie
 Jay-Jay Okocha
 John Utaka
 Joseph Yobo
 Ayila Yussuf
 Joao Rafael Elias
 Jimmy Gatete
 Olivier Karekezi
 Jimmy Mulisa
 Papa Dia
 Abdoulaye Faye
 Lamine Diatta
 Khalilou Fadiga
 Babacar Gueye
 Mamadou Niang
 Robert Suzette
 Ibrahim Koroma
 Shaun Bartlett
 Delron Buckley
 Quinton Fortune
 Amar Ramadan 
 Faisal Agab
 Mujahid Ahmed
 Haitham Elrasheed
 Joseph-Désiré Job
 Siz Dlamini
 Adékambi Olufadé
 Najeh Braham
 Wisam El Abdy
 Ziad Jaziri
 Issam Jemâa
 Mehdi Nafti
 Ali Zitouni
 Assani Bajope
 Simon Masaba
 Hassan Mubiru
 Ibrahim Sekagya
 Kalusha Bwalya
 Linos Chalwe
 Dadley Fichite
 Jacob Mulenga
 Elijah Tana
 George Mbwando
 Adam Ndlovu
 Tinashe Nengomasha
 Ashley Rambanapasi
 Kaitano Tembo

1 own goal

 Slimane Raho (playing against Zimbabwe)
 Rajabu Mwinyi (playing against Gabon)
 Nélson Veiga (playing against Ghana)
 René Nsi-Akoue (playing against Angola)
 Zvenyika Makonese (playing against Rwanda)

References

 
CAF
FIFA World Cup qualification (CAF)
Qual
Qual
qualification